Zarko may refer to:

Zarko, town in Greece
Žarko, Serbo-Croatian name